Azad Railway Station (Balochi: آزاد ریلوے اسٹیشن) is located in Balochistan, Pakistan.

See also
 List of railway stations in Pakistan
 Pakistan Railways

References

Railway stations on Quetta–Taftan Railway Line
Railway stations in Balochistan, Pakistan